James Edward Silas (born February 11, 1949) is a retired American professional basketball player, who played the point guard position. Born in Tallulah, Louisiana, Silas played the majority of his career with the Dallas Chaparrals/San Antonio Spurs of the ABA/NBA. His nicknames include "the Snake", "Captain Late" and "the Late Mr. Silas", the latter two referring to the fact that Silas seemed to play his best late in games.

Career

College
Silas played college basketball at Stephen F. Austin State University in Nacogdoches, Texas. In his senior year Silas led the Stephen F. Austin Lumberjacks to a 29-1 record, averaging 30.7 points per game. Silas was also named an NAIA All-American twice in his college career.

Professional
Silas was drafted in the fifth round of the 1972 NBA draft by the Houston Rockets. However, he was waived by the Rockets before the 1972–73 season even began. Babe McCarthy, who was coaching the Dallas Chaparrals of the American Basketball Association (ABA) at the time, decided to take a chance on Silas, and Silas signed with the Chaparrals in November 1972. Silas would prove his worth, and at the end of the season he was named to the ABA All-Rookie team.

Following the 1972–73 season, the Chaparrals were sold and moved to San Antonio, becoming the San Antonio Spurs. Silas was named to the ABA All-Star team in 1975 and 1976, as well as the All-ABA 2nd team in 1975 and All-ABA 1st team in 1976. Silas's best year statistics-wise was easily 1976, when he averaged 23.8 points, 5.4 assists, and 4.0 rebounds per game; the points and assists per game would prove to be the highest in his career.

Silas played for the Spurs for eight seasons (nine if the one season with the Dallas Chaparrals is included), including five years in the NBA after the Spurs moved into that league upon the completion of the ABA/NBA merger in 1976. Following the 1981 season Silas was traded to the Cleveland Cavaliers along with the rights to Rich Yonakur, where he played for one year before retiring.

Silas was an exceptional free throw shooter throughout his entire career, ranking in the top 10 in free throw percentage in six separate seasons, and finishing with a career free-throw percentage of 85.5%.

On February 28, 1984, Silas' #13 became the first number ever retired by the San Antonio Spurs, and he is currently one of only ten players to have received that honor from the franchise.

Career statistics

References

1949 births
Living people
African-American basketball players
American men's basketball players
Basketball players from Louisiana
Cleveland Cavaliers players
Dallas Chaparrals players
Houston Rockets draft picks
National Basketball Association players with retired numbers
People from Tallulah, Louisiana
San Antonio Spurs players
Shooting guards
Stephen F. Austin Lumberjacks basketball players
21st-century African-American people
20th-century African-American sportspeople